Pegasus Airpark  is a private-use airport owned by the Pegasus Airpark Flight Association, located  south of the central business district of  Queen Creek, in Maricopa County, Arizona, United States. The airport is part of a gated community built around the runway.

Facilities 
The airport has one asphalt runway:
 8/26 measuring

External links
 Official site
 

Airports in Maricopa County, Arizona
Residential airparks